Pornthip Santrong ((born ) is a Thai female volleyball player. She was part of the Thailand women's national volleyball team. 

She participated in the 2009 FIVB Volleyball World Grand Prix.
On club level she played for RBAC in 2009.

Club
  Idea Khonkaen (2009–present)

Awards

Clubs
 2012–13 Thailand League -  Champion, with Idea Khonkaen
 2013 Thai–Denmark Super League -  Champion, with Idea Khonkaen
 2014–15 Thailand League -  Third, with Idea Khonkaen
 2015 Thai–Denmark Super League -  Third, with Idea Khonkaen
 2016 Thai–Denmark Super League -  Third, with Idea Khonkaen
 2019 Thai–Denmark Super League -  Third, with Khonkaen Star
 2020 Thailand League –  Runner-up, with Khonkaen Star

References

External links
 Profile at FIVB.org

1988 births
Living people
Pornthip Santrong
Place of birth missing (living people)
Pornthip Santrong
Pornthip Santrong